Emmanuel Da Costa (born 3 September 1977) is a French professional football manager and former player who played as a midfielder. As of the 2022–23 season, he works as assistant manager at Ligue 2 club Saint-Étienne.

Managerial career
Da Costa played football at an amateur level in the French lower division. An intelligent midfielder, his career was plagued by injuries. Da Costa began coaching at Rouen, and eventually became a professional coach when he promoted Quevilly-Rouen to Ligue 2 in 2017.

Da Costa left Quevilly-Rouen in May 2020. A few days later, he was announced as manager of SC Lyon. He was sacked from the job on 18 December 2020, after just one win in 16 games. On 15 March 2021, he was announced as manager of Créteil.

On 9 June 2022, it was announced that Da Costa had joined Ligue 2 side Saint-Étienne as assistant manager to Laurent Batlles.

Personal life
Born in France, Da Costa is of Portuguese descent.

References

External links
Emmanuel Da Costa at FC Rouen official website 
Emmanuel Da Costa at playmakerstats.com (English version of ogol.com.br)

1977 births
Living people
Footballers from Rouen
French footballers
French football managers
French people of Portuguese descent
Association football midfielders
Championnat National 2 players
Championnat National players
FC Rouen players
Ligue 2 managers
FC Rouen managers
US Quevilly-Rouen Métropole managers
US Créteil-Lusitanos managers
AS Saint-Étienne non-playing staff